University of Arizona James E. Rogers College of Law is the law school at the University of Arizona located in Tucson, Arizona and was the first law school founded in the State of Arizona, opening its doors in 1915. Also known as University of Arizona College of Law, it was renamed in 1999 in honor of  broadcasting executive James E. Rogers, a 1962 graduate of the school, and chairman of Sunbelt Communications Company based in Las Vegas, Nevada.

Each entering JD class at Arizona Law has around 150 students, with a total student body of 700 students (across all programs).

Arizona Law is fully accredited by the American Bar Association.  It is currently ranked 46th nationally by U.S. News & World Reports "Best Graduate Schools 2022".  Arizona Law is one of 81 law schools nationwide to have a chapter of the Order of the Coif.

According to Arizona's 2017 ABA-required disclosures, 84.4% of the Class of 2017 obtained full-time, long-term, JD-required or JD-advantage employment nine months after graduation.

Employment 
According to Arizona's official 2013 ABA-required disclosures, 70.7% of the Class of 2013 obtained full-time, long-term, JD-required or JD-advantage employment nine months after graduation. Arizona's Law School Transparency under-employment score is 21.8%, indicating the percentage of the Class of 2013 unemployed, pursuing an additional degree, or working in a non-professional, short-term, or part-time job nine months after graduation.  As a regional school, the vast majority of Arizona graduates are employed in Arizona.

Costs
The total cost of attendance (indicating the cost of tuition, fees, and living expenses) for the three-year JD program at the University of Arizona James E. Rogers College of Law for the 2016–2017 academic year for Arizona Residents is $46,375 and $51,875 for Non-Residents. The James E. Rogers College of Law was named a Best Value Law School in 2012.

Programs and centers 
In addition to the J.D. program, the school offers L.L.M. and S.J.D. degrees in Indigenous Peoples Law and Policy, and International Trade and Business Law. The International Trade and Business Law program is offered in coordination with the National Law Center for Inter-American Free Trade. Students finishing their L.L.M. degree in either program may continue on to an S.J.D. degree after completing substantial original research in their field of study. Arizona Law also offers a two-year J.D. with Advanced Standing (J.D.A.S.), designed for students who have received their first law degree from a university outside the United States.  This two-year J.D. provides up to one year's worth of credits (or 29 units) for non-U.S. legal studies, effectively allowing admitted students to skip the second year of law school and go directly from completing the traditional first-year curriculum to the third year of law school.

The Programs & Centers include:
 Business Law Program
 Criminal Law and Policy Program
 Environmental Law, Science & Policy Program
 The Indigenous Peoples Law & Policy Program
 International Trade and Business Law Program
 JD Program
 Legal Writing Program
 National Law Center
 The William H. Rehnquist Center on the Constitutional Structures of Government

The school offers J.D. students the opportunity to earn certificates in: Criminal Law & Policy, Environmental Law, Science & Policy Program, Indigenous Peoples Law and Policy and International Trade and Business Law. Arizona Law also offers concentrations in: Intellectual Property Law, International Law, and Tax Law.

For students wishing to study the law who do not want to become attorneys, the school also offers a Master of Legal Studies degree with several optional concentrations.

Journals
The school is home to four student-run journals:
 Arizona Law Review
 Arizona Journal of International and Comparative Law
 Arizona Journal of Environmental Law & Policy
 Arizona Law Journal of Emerging Technologies

The school also houses the Journal of Appellate Practice and Process, that it acquired from the University of Arkansas.

Faculty 
Marc L. Miller is the current dean. There are 41 full-time faculty members. , Arizona Law was one of five law schools ranked 33rd in law school faculties based on per capita scholarly impact.

Notable alumni
 Bobby Baldock (born 1936), United States federal judge
 Andrew Leo Bettwy (born 1920), former Arizona State Land Commissioner
 William Docker Browning (1931–2008), United States federal judge
 Dennis K. Burke (born 1962), former United States Attorney for the District of Arizona
 David C. Bury (born 1942), United States federal judge
 Raner Collins (born 1952), United States federal judge
 Valdemar Aguirre Cordova (1922–1988), United States federal judge
 Stanley G. Feldman (born 1933), Former Chief Justice of Arizona
 Cleon H. Foust (1907–2003), 32nd Indiana Attorney General
 William C. Frey (1919–1979), United States federal judge
 Dennis DeConcini (born 1937), former U.S. Senator
 Irma Elsa Gonzalez (born 1948), U.S. District Court judge for the Southern District of California
 Charles Leach Hardy (born 1919), United States federal judge
 John C. Hinderaker (born 1968), United States federal judge
 Ed Hochuli (born 1950), attorney and National Football League referee
 Cindy K. Jorgenson (born 1953), U.S District Court judge for the District of Arizona
 Ann Kirkpatrick (born 1950), former U.S. Representative from Arizona's 1st district
 Jon Kyl (born 1942),  U.S. Senator representing Arizona
 Stephen M. McNamee (born 1942), United States federal judge
 Alfredo Chavez Marquez (born 1922),  United States federal judge
 Charles Andrew Muecke (1918–2007), United States federal judge
 Thomas W. Murphy (1935–1992), Associate Justice of the High Court of American Samoa
 Scott H. Rash (born 1963), United States federal judge
 Christina Reiss (born 1962), U.S. District Court judge for the District of Vermont
 Mary Anne Richey (1917–1983), United States federal judge
 John Roll (1947–2011), murdered United States federal judge
 Paul Gerhardt Rosenblatt (born 1928), United States federal judge
 Eldon Rudd (1920–2002), former U.S. Representative from Arizona's 4th district
 James A. Teilborg (born 1942), United States federal judge
 Jesse Addison Udall (1893–1980), Chief Justice of the Arizona Supreme Court
 Mo Udall (1922–1998), US Congressman from Arizona's 2nd District (1961–91), Chair of the House Interior Committee
 Stewart Udall (1920–2010), US Congressman from Arizona's 2nd District, 37th United States Secretary of the Interior
 Hal Warnock (1912–1997), attorney and baseball player for the St. Louis Browns
 Harry Clay Westover (1894–1983), United States federal judge
 Frank R. Zapata (born 1944), United States federal judge

References

External links
 James E. Rogers College of Law

University of Arizona
Law schools in Arizona
Educational institutions established in 1915
Universities and colleges in Tucson, Arizona
1915 establishments in Arizona